Kikara (Tondi Songway Kiini: Kî:rá; Fulfulde: Kikkara) is a small village and seat of the commune of Gandamia in the Cercle of Douentza in the Mopti Region of southern-central Mali.

The village lies on the northern slope of the Gandamia Massif (or Dyoundé Massif), an inselberg that rises 750 m above the plain. The massif extends for 60 km in an east-west direction and 10 km north to south.

Bananas, cassava, papaya, tobacco, onion, lettuce, chili pepper, squash are planted in Kikara. The village has a weekly Friday market. Tondi Songway Kiini is the main language of the village, and Fulfulde is also spoken in the region. The local surname is Maiga.

References

Populated places in Mopti Region